The Fiat 2800 is model of car produced by Italian car manufacturer Fiat between 1938 and 1944.

The representation sedan Fiat 2800 of 1938 the first Fiat with the new pointed front portion, the "musone" nose. The limousine continued in production until 1941.

Between 1938 and 1944 only 624 Fiat 2800's (both types) were built.

Engine
Engine type: straight-six, overhead valves
Engine capacity: 2,852 cc
Engine power:  at 4,000 rpm
Top speed:

Fiat 2800 CMC
This model continued in production until 1943, with one last one being completed in 1944.

References

Notes

2800
Cars introduced in 1938
1940s cars
Sedans
Rear-wheel-drive vehicles
World War II vehicles of Italy